William George Thomas (December 6, 1918 – October 30, 1982) was a Canadian sailor who competed in the 1956 Summer Olympics.

References

1918 births
1982 deaths
Canadian male sailors (sport)
Olympic sailors of Canada
Sailors at the 1956 Summer Olympics – 12 m2 Sharpie